Elachista endobela is a moth in the family Elachistidae. It was described by Edward Meyrick in 1926. It is found in southern India.

The wingspan is about 7 mm. The forewings are dark fuscous with a blackish median streak from near the base to two-fifths. The costal space above this forms a pale ochreous band which is irregularly sprinkled or mixed dark fuscous. The plical stigma is blackish, edged with pale ochreous. There is a pale ochreous elongate blotch with a convex waved edge extending along the apical third of the costa, enclosing and oblique dark fuscous strigula from the costa towards the apex. The hindwings are dark grey.

References

Moths described in 1926
endobela
Moths of Asia